Wrestling (Spanish:Lucha), for the 2013 Bolivarian Games, took place from 21 November to 23 November 2013.

Medal table
Key:

Medal summary

Men's Greco-Roman

Men's freestyle

Women's freestyle

References

Events at the 2013 Bolivarian Games
2013 in sport wrestling
2013 Bolivarian Games
Wrestling in Peru